Abdelrahman Ishag Hasan Abaker (born 29 July 1985) is a Sudanese international footballer who plays for Al-Ahli SC (Wad Madani), as a Right Back. He is the younger brother of Hasan Karongo.

References

1988 births
Living people
Sudanese footballers
Sudan international footballers
Association football defenders
2012 Africa Cup of Nations players
Al-Merrikh SC players
Al Khartoum SC players
Al Ahli SC (Khartoum) players
El Hilal SC El Obeid players